was a district located in Gifu Prefecture, Japan. It was dissolved on March 1, 2004 when all seven towns and villages in the district merged, effectively turning the district into the city of Gujō.

As of 2000, the district had an estimated population of 49,377 and a density of 47.8 persons per km2. The total area was 1,031 km2 (same as the area of the city).

Former towns and villages
The towns and villages formerly in the district, before merging into the city of Gujō were:
 Hachiman
 Meihō
 Minami
 Shirotori
 Takasu
 Wara
 Yamato

References

Former districts of Gifu Prefecture